Joaquín Bornes (born 24 March 1975) is a Spanish retired footballer who now works as head coach of Real Betis Juvenil B in his home country.

Career
Bornes started his senior career with Los Palacios C.F.. In 2004, he signed for Raith Rovers in the Scottish Championship, where he made thirteen appearances and scored zero goals. After that, he played for Spanish clubs SD Ponferradina and Jerez Industrial CF before retiring in 2010.

References

External links 
 Entrevista a Joaquín Bornes, repasando su trayectoria como futbolista 
 Joaquín Bornes: “No me esperaba la destitución de Mel, es una decisión arriesgada” 
 Joaquín Bornes: "La afición es lo mejor de este club, ellos sí saben valorar a los canteranos" 
 BDFutbol Profile

Association football defenders
Expatriate footballers in Scotland
Living people
Spanish footballers
Spanish expatriate footballers
Raith Rovers F.C. players
Real Betis players
Recreativo de Huelva players
Elche CF players
SD Ponferradina players
Jerez Industrial CF players
1975 births